Rynda were bodyguards of 16–17th century Russian tsars.

Rynda may also refer to:

 Russian Boyarin-class corvette Rynda, in the list of Russian steam frigates
 Russian Vitiaz-class corvette Rynda, in the list of cruisers of the Russian Navy
 Rynda (comics), a fictional character from Marvel Comics, wife of king Agon